Richard Paul Astley (born 6 February 1966) is an English singer, songwriter and radio personality, who has been active in music for several decades. He gained worldwide fame in the 1980s, having multiple hits, including his signature song "Never Gonna Give You Up", "Together Forever" and "Whenever You Need Somebody". He returned to music full-time in the 2000s after a 6-year hiatus. Outside his music career, Astley has occasionally worked as a radio DJ and a podcaster.

Born and raised in Lancashire, Astley became a musician after leaving school, as the drummer for the soul band FBI. Three years later, he rose to fame through his association with the production trio Stock Aitken Waterman; releasing the 1987 album Whenever You Need Somebody, which sold 15.2 million copies worldwide. His debut single "Never Gonna Give You Up" was a number 1 hit single in 25 countries, winning the 1988 Brit Award for Best British Single. His 1988 single "Together Forever" became his second single to top the US Billboard Hot 100, and was one of his eight songs to reach the top ten on the UK Singles Chart. The title track was a No 1 single in seven countries, and it reached No 3 in the UK. In 1988, Astley followed-up his debut album with Hold Me In Your Arms. The lead single "She Wants to Dance with Me" was Astley's first single that he wrote himself, and it became a worldwide top 10 hit.

In 1991, Astley left Stock Aitken Waterman and moved his musical direction away from dance-pop and towards soul, which he explored on his albums Free (1991) and Body and Soul (1993). His 1991 single "Cry for Help" was Astley's last single to reach the top 10 in either the US or UK. In 1993, Astley retired from music to focus on spending time with his then-partner and raising their daughter. He returned to the music industry in 2000, and released the single "Sleeping" and the album Keep It Turned On in 2001. Four years later, Astley released his covers album Portrait.

Astley became an Internet phenomenon in 2007 when the music video for his song "Never Gonna Give You Up" became integral to the Rickrolling meme, and his performance career was revitalised by the meme's popularity. In 2010, Astley released the single "Lights Out" after touring with Peter Kay. Six years later, he released his album 50 to celebrate his 50th birthday, which debuted in the UK at No. 1. He released his most recent studio album Beautiful Life in 2018, and released his greatest hits album The Best of Me in 2019. His most recent albums were recorded at his home studio in Surrey.

By the time of his brief retirement, Astley had sold approximately 40 million records worldwide. A year after the Rickrolling meme began, Astley was voted "Best Act Ever" by Internet users at the MTV Europe Music Awards 2008. His song "Never Gonna Give You Up" reached 1 billion views on YouTube in July 2021, becoming the fourth 1980s song to reach this milestone (behind "Billie Jean" by Michael Jackson, "Take On Me" by A-ha and "Sweet Child o' Mine" by Guns N' Roses).

Early life
Astley was born on 6 February 1966 in Newton-le-Willows in Lancashire, the fourth child of his family. His parents divorced when he was five and Astley was brought up by his father Horace Astley. Astley remained in very close contact with his mother Cynthia Astley, who lived a few streets away from his father. After finding out that his father was the one who kicked his mother out of the house, Astley distanced himself from his father. When he was 10 years old, Astley began singing in a local church choir, which began his love of music.

During his schooldays, Astley formed and played the drums in a number of local bands, where he met guitarist David Morris. After leaving school at sixteen, Astley was employed during the day as a driver in his father's market-gardening business and played drums on the Northern club circuit at night in bands such as Give Way – specialising in covering Beatles and Shadows songs – and FBI, which won several local talent competitions.

Career

1985–1986: Signing with Stock Aitken Waterman
In 1985, Astley was performing as a drummer with a soul band named FBI, with Morris on guitar. They were a well-known local band writing and performing their own music, gigging in pubs and clubs. When FBI's lead singer left the band, and Morris left to concentrate on his career in hairdressing, Astley offered to be the lead vocalist. This was when he was noticed by the record producer Pete Waterman, who persuaded him to come to London to work at the Pete Waterman Limited (PWL) recording studio, with RCA Records publishing his records. Under the tutelage of the production team of Mike Stock, Matt Aitken and Pete Waterman, known as Stock Aitken Waterman (SAW), Astley was taught about the recording process and groomed for his future career, supposedly starting off as the recording studio "tea boy". The reason for Astley to be hired as a "tape op" was to overcome his shyness. SAW also hired most of FBI, including Morris as a guitarist/songwriter.

1987–1989: Success
His first single was "When You Gonna", released as a collaboration with Lisa Fabien, and was produced by Phil Harding and Ian Curnow. "We were at a stage early on with Rick, when no one knew quite what to do with him," recalled Harding. "The idea was to make him happen in the clubs... [but the song] opened up the doors for him at Capital Radio." The song was released in May 1987, and with no promotion managed to chart at No. 17 in the Netherlands and No. 20 in Belgium.

Astley's first solo offering was "Never Gonna Give You Up", recorded on New Year's Day 1987, and released eight months later, in August. Although his producers were initially unenthusiastic about the track, Astley's distinctive rich, deep voice combined with dance-pop made the song an immediate success, spending five weeks at the top of the British charts and becoming the year's highest-selling single. The song was also a worldwide number-one hit, topping the charts in 24 other countries, including the US, Australia, and West Germany. It was the first of 13 (worldwide) top 30 hit singles for him. "Never Gonna Give You Up" won Best British Single at the 1988 BPI awards (now called the BRIT Awards), and he performed it in front of a global audience of 100 million.

Astley's next single was "Whenever You Need Somebody", which was released in October. The single was a recycled Stock Aitken Waterman song, originally recorded by O'Chi Brown in 1985, which Stock says was resurrected in the rush to gather strong follow up material in the wake of Astley's unexpectedly huge global success. It became a successful European hit, reaching No. 1 in seven countries, including West Germany and Sweden. It also reached No. 3 in the UK. It was not released in North America.

In November 1987, the album Whenever You Need Somebody, containing four tracks written by Astley, reached number one in the UK and Australia and No. 10 in the US. It was certified 4× Platinum in the UK and Canada, and 2× Platinum in the US. Whenever You Need Somebody sold 15.2 million copies worldwide, making Astley the top-selling British act of the year.

In December 1987, Astley released a cover version of the Nat King Cole classic "When I Fall in Love". This single is mainly remembered for a closely fought contest for UK Christmas Number 1. Rivals EMI, hoping to see their act the Pet Shop Boys reach No. 1, rereleased Cole's version. This led to a slowdown of purchases of Astley's version, allowing the Pet Shop Boys to reach the coveted top spot with their cover version of Always on My Mind. Despite selling over 200,000 copies and gaining a Silver certification from the BPI, Astley's "When I Fall in Love" peaked in the UK at No. 2 for two weeks. The rerelease of Cole's version reached No. 4. The B side for Astley was a dance number, "My Arms Keep Missing You", which was successful in mainland Europe but wasn't released on an album until the 2002 compilation Greatest Hits.

Astley's fourth single release was "Together Forever" (1988), reaching No. 2 in the UK. It was denied the top spot by Kylie Minogue's debut "I Should Be So Lucky", which reached No. 1 following her successful role as Charlene Robinson in Neighbours. "Together Forever" was more successful in the US, topping the charts, making it his second and last US chart-topper. In 1989 Astley was nominated for a Grammy Award for Best New Artist but lost to Tracy Chapman.

His fifth and final release from his debut album was "It Would Take a Strong Strong Man". It was a more soulful song than his other releases, and was mainly intended for the North American market. It was not released in Britain. It was another hit, reaching No. 10 on the US Billboard Hot 100 and No. 1 in Canada. During the period between his debut release and his fifth single, Astley outsold every other artist in the world. In the UK, he was in the Top 40 every week for the first six months of his career.

Production of the singer's follow up album with Stock Aitken Waterman got off to a rocky start, when a distressed Astley rejected the set's intended first single, "Nothing Can Divide Us" — a track the producers then gave to Jason Donovan. Wishing to placate an unhappy Astley, producer Pete Waterman allowed him to start work with other writers and producers under the PWL umbrella, but a fire in the PWL studios then destroyed much of Astley's new material, causing a delay in the release of his second album. Hold Me in Your Arms was released in January 1989, containing five singles, and reached No. 8 in the UK and No. 19 in the US, being certified platinum in the UK and gold in the US.

Astley's relationship with British media deteriorated significantly after the release of Hold Me in Your Arms, with the media calling him a "puppet" of Stock Aitken Waterman, although Astley had written five of his new album's tracks. The negative press affected the sales of his singles.

The first single from the album was "She Wants to Dance with Me", written by Astley. He composed the track in the style of Whitney Houston's hit, "I Wanna Dance With Somebody (Who Loves Me)" in an effort to win the confidence of Waterman, who was a huge fan of Houston's song. It was another successful single, reaching No. 6 on both the UK and US charts.

"Take Me to Your Heart" was the next single to be released from the album. It was one of four songs written and produced by Stock Aitken Waterman that were belatedly added to the album in order to help Astley make his release deadline following the fire. These four tracks were written and produced in just two days, with writer Matt Aitken confirming "Take Me to Your Heart" was inspired by house music act Inner City's 1988 hit, "Big Fun". The single reached No. 8 in the UK and was not released in the US.

"Hold Me in Your Arms", a ballad written by Astley, reached No. 10 in the UK and was also not released in North America. The next two singles released from the album were intended for the North American market. "Giving Up on Love" and a cover of The Temptations song "Ain't Too Proud To Beg" charted at No. 38 and No. 89 in the US respectively.

In December 1989, Astley set off on his first world tour, touring 15 countries including the UK, US, Australia, and Japan. By the end of the tour, he was tired of the negative press and wanted to explore alternative paths as a musician. He left Stock Aitken Waterman and RCA Records bought out his contract with PWL.

1990–1993: Switch to soul and adult contemporary and career break
By 1990, Astley decided to leave his dance-pop days behind him, moving towards his passion, soul. This shift in musical genre led him to change his image, ditching the boy next door look, growing his hair, and presenting himself as a mature and passionate musician. His third album, Free, was released in 1991 and contained collaborations with Elton John. It had three singles and reached No 9 in the UK and No 31 in the US.

He achieved one more major success with his 1991 ballad "Cry for Help", which reached No 7 in both the UK and the US. The other two singles from Free were not as successful. "Move Right Out" reached No 58 in the UK and No 81 in the US, and "Never Knew Love" reached No 70 in the UK and did not chart in the US. Free marked the end of Astley's successful period, and "Cry for Help" was the last Astley single to make the Top 10 in either the UK or US.

His next album, Body and Soul, was released in 1993, and was largely an Adult Contemporary album. By the time the album was released, Astley had decided to retire from the music industry. As a result, the album did not get much promotion, not charting in the UK but managing to make the Billboard 200, peaking at No 182. The two singles, "The Ones You Love" and "Hopelessly," performed very well on the US adult contemporary chart, peaking at No 19 and No 4 respectively. "The Ones You Love" peaked at No 48 in the UK but did not chart in the US. "Hopelessly" also crossed over and peaked at No 28 on the US Billboard 100, staying in the US top 40 for five weeks, and No 33 in the UK. It was the last hit to chart on the Top 40 in the UK and US. It was named as one of the most performed songs at the 1994 BMI Awards, and is one of the few songs to achieve BMI 'Million-Air' status.

1994–2000: Retirement
Astley retired from the music industry in 1993, deciding that family life was more important. During his time out of the music business, he raised his daughter, born in 1992. For much of the 1990s and early 2000s, Astley remained out of the spotlight. He later said this was due to his growing frustration with the business side of things. During this period he co-wrote "Mission Statement", a track for former Marillion singer Fish's 1999 solo album Raingods with Zippos.

2000–present: Return to singing and renewed success
Seven years after Body and Soul, Astley returned to the music industry, signing a co-publishing deal with Polydor and recording a new album, Keep It Turned On, between November 2000 and September 2001, and released in late 2001. The album featured the single "Sleeping", which became a minor club hit, thanks to a set of remixes from the US house producer Todd Terry. Keep It Turned On was only released in Continental Europe.

Astley's first compilation album, Greatest Hits, was released in 2002, and reached No 16 on the UK Albums Chart. With no promotion from Astley, it sold over 100,000 copies and was certified Gold by the British Phonographic Industry. In 2003 he charted at No 10 in the UK as a songwriter with "Shakespeare's (Way With) Words" performed by short-lived boy band One True Voice.

In 2004, Astley toured for the first time in 14 years, which led him to a record contract with Sony BMG.

In March 2005, Astley released the album Portrait, in which he covered many classic standards such as "Vincent", "Nature Boy" and "Close to You". Astley and Sony BMG were unhappy with the result so the album was poorly promoted, yet it managed to reach No 26 on the UK Albums Chart.

In April 2008, the album The Ultimate Collection: Rick Astley was released by Sony BMG, and by early May it had reached #17 on the UK Top 40 Albums Chart, again with no promotion by Astley.

In September 2008, Astley was nominated for the 'Best Act Ever' award at the MTV Europe Music Awards. The push to make Astley the winner of the award continued after the announcement, as did efforts to encourage MTV to invite Astley to the awards ceremony. On 7 November, following a massive Internet campaign by fans, Astley won the award in Liverpool but was not there in person to receive it. Perez Hilton collected the prize on his behalf. On the back of this, "Never Gonna Give You Up" (which had recently become an Internet meme via Rickrolling) returned to the UK charts, over 21 years after it was released, peaking at No 73 during the Christmas period.

During the late 2000s, Astley continued touring across the globe, touring with various other 1980s acts, such as Boy George and Belinda Carlisle, in the Here and Now Tour. In April 2009, he wrote an article for Time about moot.

Astley was a special guest throughout Peter Kay's new tour, The Tour That Doesn't Tour Tour...Now On Tour, from 27 April to 22 May 2010. To mark the occasion, Astley released a new single, "Lights Out", on his own label on 7 June 2010. It was his first release in the UK Singles Chart in 17 years. It was well received by radio, peaking at No 15 on the UK Airplay Charts, but failed to become a commercial hit, reaching only No 97 on the UK Singles Chart.

During the summer of 2010, Astley became a radio DJ for London's Magic FM, presenting a Sunday show. The initial contract was for eight weeks, but he proved popular with listeners and his contract was extended till the end of the year. In December 2010, Astley co-hosted the Chris Evans Breakfast Show on BBC Radio 2 with Peter Kay, and in March 2011 appeared in Comic Relief's Red Nose Day telethon on the BBC.

In April 2016 Astley released "Keep Singing", from his forthcoming album 50. Interviewed by Amanda Holden on the Lorraine show on 7 April, Astley explained that turning 50 had prompted him to release the single. He said, "It was a big milestone. I got back in the studio and friends were telling me the material I was working on was pretty good. So I decided to go for it." On 31 May, the release date for Astley's 50 was revealed to be 10 June 2016. The album reached number one on the Official UK Album Sales charts in the week of 17 June 2016 to 23 June 2016.

In September 2016 Astley released the single "God Says / Dance", together with an official video.

On 1 June 2018, Astley posted a video on Twitter announcing his upcoming album Beautiful Life set for release on 20 July. He also released a single of the same name. Astley did a tour, the #BeautifulLife Tour, and tickets were first available for purchase to anyone who pre-ordered the album. Beautiful Life was released earlier than previously said, on 13 July 2018. The album peaked at number 6 on the UK Albums Chart.

In 2019, Astley served as the support act on Take That's Greatest Hits Live 38-date tour in Britain and Ireland. Astley is also an occasional guest vocalist at Foo Fighters concerts, and has previously performed with A-ha and Kylie Minogue. During live performances where he sings "Never Gonna Give You Up", Astley sometimes shouts out to the audience that he is feeling "bloody marvellous" or that he is feeling "fantastic" after the line "And if you ask me how I'm feeling" to have some banter with the audience.

On 12 October 2019, Astley appeared on CBeebies Bedtime Stories.

On 25 October 2019, Astley released a new album, The Best of Me, which includes some of his original tracks, some reimagined versions of his existing songs, and the new single "Every One of Us". One of the reimagined songs is a pianoforte version of "Never Gonna Give You Up", in which Astley changes the key to F minor. In live concerts, Astley sings it in A minor.

In June 2020, towards the end of the nationwide lockdown in England due to the COVID-19 pandemic, Astley released four cover songs; "Ain't No Sunshine" by Bill Withers, "Everlong" by Foo Fighters, "Titanium" by David Guetta and "Better Now" by Post Malone. Around this time, Astley made a TikTok account, launching it with a video of him dancing to "Never Gonna Give You Up" which received millions of views.

On 30 November 2020, Astley released a single, "Love This Christmas", the video featuring Astley performing amid a flurry of snow and dancing snowmen. To accompany the single, Astley launched a signed limited edition Christmas card, with all proceeds going to the Shooting Stars Children's Hospices.

On 16 March 2021, Astley recorded a cover of the Temptations song "My Girl".

On 7 April 2021, Astley released a single, "Unwanted", inspired by the era and vibes of the original podcast.

On 28 July 2021, "Never Gonna Give You Up" hit one billion views on YouTube, making Astley the fourth 1980s artist to pass this milestone, after Michael Jackson, A-ha and Guns N' Roses. Astley celebrated by releasing a new limited-edition, signed, numbered and coloured 7" vinyl single of "Never Gonna Give You Up", backed with the pianoforte version from The Best of Me.

On 2 September 2021, amid the news that ABBA have reunited, Astley released a cover of their song "The Winner Takes It All".

On 14 September 2021, Astley announced he would be collaborating with the indie band Blossoms to perform songs by The Smiths.

Rickrolling Internet phenomenon

In 2007, Astley became the subject of a viral Internet meme known as rickrolling. The meme is a type of bait and switch using a disguised hyperlink that leads to the Never Gonna Give you Up music video. When victims click on a seemingly unrelated link, the site with the music video loads instead of what was expected, and in doing so they are said to have been "rickrolled". The meme has also extended to using the song's lyrics in unexpected places. The meme gained mainstream attention in 2008 through several publicized events, particularly when YouTube used it on its 2008 April Fools' Day event. Rickrolling saw a massive resurgence online in the early 2020s. In online classes on Zoom during the worldwide COVID-19 lockdown, students often rickrolled their classmates and teachers. A 4K remaster of the "Never Gonna Give You Up" music video went viral in early 2021.

Initially, Astley, who had only recently returned to performing after a 10-year hiatus, was hesitant about using his newfound popularity from the meme to further his career, but accepted the fame when he rickrolled the 2008 Macy's Thanksgiving Day Parade with a surprise performance of the song. Since then, Astley has seen his performance career revitalised by the meme's popularity. In an interview, Astley stated that one of his favourite rickroll videos is "BarackRoll", a rickroll featuring clips from rallies by Barack Obama during his 2008 presidential campaign, edited to make it look as though he is singing "Never Gonna Give You Up".

Astley himself has been rickrolled a few times; in fact, the first time he was rickrolled actually pre-dated the viral phenomenon. In an interview with Larry King, Astley stated that the first time he fell for the prank was through an email his friend sent him during the early 2000s. On a Reddit post in June 2020, a user claimed to have met Astley backstage when they were 12 years old, but the user posted a link to the song instead of a picture verifying the encounter. Astley later confirmed he had been tricked into clicking the link. The post became the most upvoted post of 2020 on Reddit.

Personal life
Astley has been married to film producer Lene Bausager since 2003. They have a daughter who has a master's degree in fine art and is a garden designer. Astley met Bausager when she was working as a promoter with RCA in 1987, and she is now a film producer. He and his wife live in the Surrey town of Molesey, and his daughter lives in Denmark. He maintains a home recording studio and has a collection of guitars. He is of no relation to music producer Jon Astley.

Discography

 Whenever You Need Somebody (1987)
 Hold Me in Your Arms (1988)
 Free (1991)
 Body & Soul (1993)
 Keep It Turned On (2001)
 Portrait (2005)
 50 (2016)
 Beautiful Life (2018)

See also
List of awards and nominations received by Rick Astley
List of artists who reached number one in the United States
List of artists who reached number one on the U.S. Dance Club Songs chart
List of Billboard number-one dance club songs
Lists of UK Albums Chart number ones
Lists of UK Singles Chart number ones
List of Billboard number-one singles
List of Billboard Hot 100 number-ones by British artists

References

External links

 
 
 

 
1966 births
20th-century English male singers
20th-century English singers
21st-century English male singers
21st-century English singers
Brit Award winners
English pop singers
English soul singers
English radio personalities
English male singer-songwriters
English radio DJs
British Internet celebrities
English podcasters
English drummers
Living people
MTV Europe Music Award winners
Musicians from Lancashire
People from Newton-le-Willows
People from St Helens, Merseyside
People from Surrey
Polydor Records artists
RCA Records artists
BBC Radio 2 presenters
Dance-pop musicians